Mohammed Hamid (born 1976) is a Ugandan business magnate and investor. He is the owner and chairman of the executive board of directors for the  Aya Group.

According to Forbes in 2015, he was the second-richest African under 40, after Tanzanian multi-millionaire Mohammed Dewji. He is currently the 2nd wealthiest individual in Uganda, with an estimated networth of USD$1.259 Billion.

Background
Hamid  was born in the Sudan circa 1976. In 1987, he traveled to Uganda for the first time to visit his elder brother, Mohammed El Hamid, who operated a commodity trading business called Pan Afric Impex. He fell in love with the country and stayed.

The younger Mohammed worked with his elder brother until the early 1990s when he started his first company, Pan Afric Commodities, also a commodities trading business. Later, he bought a milling machine from Premiere Mills, one of the companies owned by businessman Sudhir Ruparelia. In 1997, he bought a  piece of land in Kawempe, a suburb of Kampala, where he relocated the machinery and started milling wheat. Later he bought more mills and started baking bread and confectioneries.

Later, he started a trucking business, FIFI Transport Uganda Limited, later renamed Panafric Transport, which is a leading hauler in the East and Central African region", with a current fleet of hundreds of heavy duty Scania and MAN prime movers and semi trailers

. One of his companies, Aya Investments, is the developer of the Pearl of Africa Hotel, launched in 2017 by President Yoweri Museveni. In 2018, Forbes listed Hamid among the 5 young African Millionaires to watch.

See also
 List of wealthiest people in Uganda
 List of banks in Uganda
 Banking in Uganda

References

External links
 Aya Group Homepage

1976 births
Living people
Ugandan businesspeople
Ugandan people of Sudanese descent
Ugandan businesspeople in real estate
Businesspeople in the hospitality industry
Makerere University alumni
People from Kampala District
Ugandan business executives